The western unspotted looper (Pseudeva palligera) is a moth of the family Noctuidae found in western North America. It has been recorded from British Columbia to California.

The wingspan is 29–30 mm. The larvae probably feed on Thalictrum.

External links
 Image
 Bug Guide
 Species info

Plusiinae
Moths of North America